Two total lunar eclipses occurred in 1964: 

 25 June 1964 lunar eclipse
 19 December 1964 lunar eclipse

See also 
 List of 20th-century lunar eclipses
 Lists of lunar eclipses